Ramy Imam (Arabic: رامي إمام; born 25 November 1974) is an Egyptian director,  and producer.

Biography 
Imam was born in Egypt and graduated from the department theater of the American University of Cairo in 1999. He made his acting debut in Fast Asleep.

He later worked as a stage director, later joining his father Adel Emam in the Body Guard game. Then he began directing many films and television series.

In 2016 he established his own production company, Magnum, and produced many television series.

Filmography

1996 
 Fast asleep (Arabic: النوم في العسل)

Director

Cinema 
 Booha
 1/8 Dastet Ashrar
 A Natural-Born Fool
 Ameer El-Zalam
 Hassan and Marcus
 Kalashnikov 
 Sun and Moon

TV series 
 Ayza Atgawz (I Want to Marry) 
 Firqat Naji Atallah (2012)
 Al Araaf (2013)
 Saheb El Saa'da (2014)
 Mamoun We Shoraka (2015)
 Ostaz We Ra'is Qesm (2016)
 Afaret Adly Allam (2017)
 ..Awalem Khafeya.. (2018)

References

External links
 

Living people
1974 births
Egyptian film producers
Egyptian film directors